AA was a designator used for several different diesel locomotive types custom built by General Motors Corporation EMC/GM with passenger or baggage space in the same body.  This locomotive is listed as class AA-6 by R. Craig, and the designation is logical as the locomotive is described as "half an E6" in the Second Diesel Spotter's Guide.

One such was a single locomotive built for the Missouri Pacific Railroad, delivered in August 1940, numbered #7100. MP 7100 was built for service with the Delta Eagle passenger train, which ran between Memphis, Tennessee and Tallulah, Louisiana.  Note: Missouri Pacific ordered all their 'E' units with portholes instead of square windows like most of the E series from the EA to E7's.  This was the only MoPac unit with square windows (on the baggage door).

Since the two-car train the unit would have to haul was comparatively light, the AA was built with only one 1,000 hp EMD 567 V12 prime mover, and a baggage compartment where the second diesel would have been.

Other EMC/GM locomotives carrying the AA classification include the Pioneer Zephyr, Flying Yankee, and General Pershing Zephyr power units.

External links
Photo of 7100 pulling the Delta Eagle

References 

 

A1A-3 locomotives
AA6
Missouri Pacific Railroad
Passenger locomotives
Diesel-electric locomotives of the United States
Railway locomotives introduced in 1940
Scrapped locomotives
Standard gauge locomotives of the United States